Rock Oak is an unincorporated community on North River in Hardy County, West Virginia, United States. The Board on Geographic Names officially decided upon the community's name in 1973.

The community was named for the rock oak trees near the original town site.

References

Unincorporated communities in Hardy County, West Virginia
Unincorporated communities in West Virginia